The Columbia Valley AVA is an American Viticultural Area which lies in the Columbia River Plateau, through much of central and southern Washington State, with a small section crossing into the neighboring state of Oregon. The AVA includes the drainage basin of the Columbia River and its tributaries through much of Washington. Allen Shoup, president of Washington State's largest winery Chateau Ste. Michelle, understood the importance of obtaining appellation status for Washington State to grow the reputation of the vineyards. He hired Drs. Wade Wolfe and Walter Clore to petition the federal government for appellation status, a request that was granted in 1984. The Columbia Valley AVA includes 99% of the total vineyard area planted in the state of Washington. Grapes grown here include Cabernet Sauvignon, Merlot, Chardonnay, Riesling, Syrah, Pinot Gris, and Sauvignon blanc. Concord grapes and other Vitis labrusca grapes are grown in the region as well. The unique climates of the area allow the Columbia Valley to produce wines that are very fruit-forward, like California wine, but which also retain some of the balance and structure of European wine.

Geography 

The Columbia Valley AVA lies mostly in Washington state, with a small section in Oregon. The Cascade Range forms its western boundary with the Palouse regions bordering the area to the east. To the north, the Okanogan–Wenatchee National Forest forms a border with the AVA and Canada. It encompasses the valleys formed by the Columbia River and its tributaries, including the Walla Walla River, the Snake River, and the Yakima River. The Columbia valley stretches between the 46th parallel and 47th parallel which puts it in line with the well-known French wine growing regions of Bordeaux and Burgundy. The northern latitude gives the areas two more hours of additional daylight during the summer growing season than wine regions of California receive. The volcanic and sandy loam soil of the valley offers good drainage and is poor in nutrients, ideal in forcing the vine to concentrate its resources into the grape clusters.

Nine smaller AVAs designate unique growing areas of special distinction within the larger Columbia Valley AVA.  These are the Ancient Lakes AVA, Yakima Valley AVA, the Red Mountain AVA, the Walla Walla Valley AVA, the Horse Heaven Hills AVA, the Rattlesnake Hills AVA, Lake Chelan AVA, Snipes Mountain AVA and the Wahluke Slope AVA.  North of the Rattlesnake Hills is a region commonly known as Columbia Cascade, but which is not officially recognized as an American Viticultural Area.  Other wine growing regions of distinction that has not yet been granted AVA status include the Othello region located in Adams County and the Tri-Cities area around the towns of Kennewick, Pasco and Richland.

Climate 

The vast size of the appellation allows for an array of diverse microclimates among the various sub-appellations, but the whole region shares the common climate traits of cold winters and long dry growing seasons with low humidity. The warm days and cool nights of the area help retain the balance of acid and sugar levels in the grape which give Washington wines their characteristic balance in flavors. The peak ripening of the grapes occurs during the last four to six weeks of the growing season, with the grapes hanging on the vines a little longer than in California. This allows the grape more time to develop maturity in tannins as well as other aroma and profile characteristics that will be brought out in the resulting wines. The longer growing season also allows the grapes to be harvested at a cooler temperature than in other more southerly wine regions.

Deep winter freezes are the main climate threat to the grape growing industry of the Columbia Valley. Many vineyards incorporate wind turbines to keep air circulating around the grapes and stay warm enough to prevent frost. In most years, the vines enter into a long winter dormancy rather than freeze, which helps the vines come out of the winter and into the growing season healthier.

Irrigation 

The development of intricate irrigation systems has allowed this area to become a premium grape growing region. Using water from the  nearby Columbia, Snake, Yakima and Walla Walla rivers growers are able to precisely control the timing and amount of water that the vines receive. This control over the vines' potential vigor has a large influence on the resulting yields and quality of the grapes.

See also 
Washington wine
Oregon wine

References

External links 
 Map of Columbia Valley AVA
 Geography of Washington State: Columbia Basin, Washington State Department of Natural Resources
  TTB AVA Map
 Columbia Vally Wine

American Viticultural Areas
Oregon wine
Washington (state) wine
1984 establishments in Oregon